Xylophagus cinctus is a species of fly in the family Xylophagidae

Distribution
Europe, Russia, China, Alaska to Quebec, south to California & Mississippi.

References

Xylophagidae
Diptera of Europe
Insects described in 1776
Taxa named by Charles De Geer